Hacıalılı is a village and municipality in the Tovuz Rayon of Azerbaijan. It has a population of 1,545.

References

Populated places in Tovuz District